The Moped Army is an organization of moped enthusiasts, centered on the organization's website which serves as a catalyst for the spread of moped culture and the organization of moped-related events throughout the US and Canada. Founded in 1997 as the Decepticons in Kalamazoo, Michigan, by Daniel "Weber" Kastner, Simon King, and Brennan Sang, and as of September 2016 several branches have retired and hold "Emeritus" status. The branches each have a unique name, often inspired by the city in which they are based, and are self-governing; implementing their own criteria regarding membership and activities. With the motto of "Swarm and Destroy", the Moped Army has been the subject of a graphic novel by Paul Sizer and a documentary called Swarm and Destroy.

Rise Against music video
Members of the "emeritus" Chicago branch of Moped Army, Peddy Cash, were featured in the music video for the song "Re-Education (Through Labor)" by the American rock band Rise Against, which was released in September 2008. In the video they are seen riding their mopeds through a city and planting bombs.

Notes

References

External links

Moped Army Official Website

Mopeds
Motorcycle clubs in the United States